The Scott Massacre, coming after the recent (1813) Fort Mims massacre, was a factor convincing the United States that the Creeks must be defeated, beginning the Seminole Wars. It took place at the end of November, 1817. Several hundred Creek warriors known as Red Sticks, led by Homathlimico, with Josiah Francis in the rear, attacked a vessel commanded by Lieutenant Richard W. Scott. The boat was heading up the Apalachicola River to supply Camp Crawford on the Flint River in southwest Georgia; the attack was at the confluence of the rivers (Nicolls' Outpost). Besides the supplies, the boat carried 20 sick soldiers, seven women, four children, and a guard of 20 armed soldiers. After a bloody massacre and scalping, only seven survived, one woman, and six soldiers who escaped by jumping into the river and swimming to the opposite shore, where friendly Creeks helped them reach safety at Camp Crawford on December 2, 1817.

The children were killed by having their heads bashed against the sides of the boat. Scott was killed by having splinters of fatwood driven into his body and set afire, "an excruciating form of execution that had its roots deep in the ancient traditions of the Creek Indians".

News of the massacre was immediately sent by the camp commander, Gen. Edmund P. Gaines, to Secretary of War John C. Calhoun, and Gen. Andrew Jackson. It was reported widely in the American press. "An infuriated President James Monroe directed that General Jackson be ordered to the frontier and that the Seminoles and Red Sticks be punished without regard to whether they were in the United States or Spanish Florida." This was the first or nearly the first battle of the First Seminole War. 

The attack was soon followed by the Battle of Ocheesee. Camp Crawford was renamed Fort Scott in the commander's honor.

Further reading

Notes

References

Seminole Wars
Pre-statehood history of Florida
History of Georgia (U.S. state)
Battles of the Seminole Wars
Gadsden County, Florida
Muscogee
Massacres by Native Americans
Native American history of Florida
Andrew Jackson
Native American history of Georgia (U.S. state)
1817 in the United States
Battles of the Creek War
Battles of the War of 1812 in Georgia (U.S. state)
November 1817 events